György Kosztolánczy (born 17 February 1946) is a Hungarian former swimmer. He competed in two events at the 1964 Summer Olympics.

References

1946 births
Living people
Hungarian male swimmers
Olympic swimmers of Hungary
Swimmers at the 1964 Summer Olympics
Swimmers from Budapest
20th-century Hungarian people
21st-century Hungarian people